Louis Lurine (1812 – 30 November 1860) was a 19th-century French homme de lettres, journalist, playwright, novelist and historian.

Biography 
Born in Spain from French parents, he was raised in Paris and Bordeaux. He started writing at an early age, collaborated to some vaudevilles and was attached to several newspapers in the provinces. He trained Félix Solar when he was a beginner.

Back to Paris in 1840, he contributed feuilletons and short stories to the Courrier français, Le National and Le Siècle. For several years, he worked to books dedicated to the history of Paris while continuing his theatrical career. He became editor of the political journal La Séance in 1848 and of the theatrical magazine La Comédie in 1853. He also was president of the Société des gens de lettres.

He was managing director of the Théâtre du Vaudeville from 1858 until his death.

Main publications 

Le Cauchemar politique, satirical pamphlet (1831)
Physiologie du vin de Champagne, par deux buveurs d’eau, with Bouvier (1841)
Les Rues de Paris. Paris ancien et moderne, 1844 : origines, histoire, monuments, costumes, mœurs, chroniques et traditions, illustrated with 300 drawings by Grandville, Daumier, etc. (2 volumes, 1844) Text online 1 Illustrations online
Histoire de Napoléon, racontée aux enfants petits et grands (1844)
Les Environs de Paris, paysage, histoire, monuments, mœurs, chroniques et traditions, under the direction of Charles Nodier and Louis Lurine, illustrated with 200 drawings (1844) Text online
Les Prisons de Paris, histoire, types, mœurs, mystères, with Maurice Alhoy (1846) Text online
La Vierge du travail (1846)
Les Couvents, with Alphonse Brot, illustrated by Henri Baron, Tony Johannot, François-Louis Français and Célestin Nanteuil (1846) 
Histoire poétique et politique de M. de Lamartine (1844)
Histoire secrète et publique de la police ancienne et moderne (3 volumes, 1847)
Le Treizième Arrondissement de Paris, novel (1850)
Le Train de Bordeaux, voyage dans le passé, short stories (1854)
Ici l’on aime. Le Cœur de Mignon. Le Secret des aumônes. L’Âme du violon. Le Chasseur d’ombres. La Véritable Mort de Vatel. Le Mouchoir de Bérénice. Pierrot. La Guerre des Dieux. L’Avocat. L’Oreiller. Le Cœur et l’esprit. Le Club des mendiants. Le Prédicateur. Le Paratonnerre. Héro et Léandre, short stories (1854)
Le Mannequin russe, pamphlet (1854)
Le Palais-royal (1855)
Éloge de Balzac (1856)
Voyage dans le passé (1860)
Theatre
 1832 : Le Duc de Reischtadt, drama in 2 acts mingled with couplets, with Jacques Arago Text online
 1832 : Chabert, histoire contemporaine in 2 acts, mingled with song, with Jacques Arago, Théâtre du Vaudeville (2 July) Text online
 1833 : Richelieu à quatre-vingts ans, comedy in 1 act, mingled with song, with Jacques-François Ancelot, Théâtre du Vaudeville (16 October)
 1833 : La Peur du mal, comedy in 1 act, mingled with song, with Jacques-François Ancelot, Théâtre du Vaudeville (25 November)
 1834 : Madame Basile, comedy in 1 act, with Félix Solar, Théâtre du Vaudeville (17 June) 
 1841 : Caliste, ou le Geôlier, comédie-vaudeville in 1 act, with Narcisse Fournier, Théâtre du Gymnase-Dramatique (30 October)
 1842 : Le Droit d’aînesse, comédie-vaudeville in 2 acts, with Albéric Second, Théâtre des Délassements-Comiques (13 August)
 1854 : La Comédie à Ferney, comedy in 1 act and in prose, with Albéric Second, Théâtre-Français (15 July)
 1854 : Le Vieux Bodin, comédie-vaudeville in 1 act, Théâtre du Vaudeville (14 October)
 1856 : Madame Bijou, comédie-vaudeville in 1 act, with Raymond Deslandes, Théâtre des Variétés (24 January)
 1856 : L’Amant aux bouquets, comedy in 1 act, with Raymond Deslandes, Théâtre du Palais-Royal (1 March) Text online
 1856 : Les Femmes peintes par elles-mêmes, comedy in 1 act, with Raymond Deslandes, Théâtre du Vaudeville (30 May)
 1856 : Le Camp des révoltées, fantaisie in 1 act, with Raymond Deslandes, Théâtre des Variétés (17 July)
 1857 : Les Comédiennes, comedy in 4 acts, with Raymond Deslandes, Théâtre du Gymnase (9 May)
 1858 : La Boîte d’argent, comedy in 1 act, with Raymond Deslandes, after a short story by Alexandre Dumas fils, Théâtre du Gymnase-Dramatique (12 April) Text online
 1859 :  Monsieur Jules, ou le Père terrible, comedy in 2 acts, mingled with song, with Raymond Deslandes, Théâtre des Variétés (31 October)

Honours 
 Chevalier de la Légion d'honneur (25 April 1847 decree)

References

Sources 
 Pierre Larousse, Grand Dictionnaire universel du XIXe, vol. X, 1873, p. 794, and Gustave Vapereau, Dictionnaire universel des contemporains, 1858, p. 1130.

External links 
 Louis Lurine on Data.bnf.fr

19th-century French dramatists and playwrights
French theatre managers and producers
19th-century French journalists
French male journalists
19th-century French historians
Chevaliers of the Légion d'honneur
People from Burgos
1810 births
1860 deaths
19th-century French male writers